The Elena Gjika Elementary School is a cultural heritage monument in Pristina, Kosovo, and one of the oldest intact buildings in the entire city.

History and description
The building housing Elena Gjika (Dora d'Istria) Elementary School is at the intersection of Zenel Salihu and Emin Duraku Streets at the edge of Prishtina's old city center. Built at the turn of the 20th century in the Vienna Secession architectural style, the school features a mix of square and arched windows that is unusual in the city. Although the overall structure and the front façade preserved, side windows have been renovated with newer plastic and the roof has been repaired.

See also 
 Education in Pristina
 Elena Gjika (Dora d'Istria)

References

Historic sites in Kosovo
Schools in Kosovo
Buildings and structures in Pristina
Schools in Pristina
Elementary and primary schools in Kosovo